Méddy Lina (born 11 January 1986) is a Guadeloupean professional footballer who most recently played as a defender for Boulogne. He made four appearances for Vannes OC in Ligue 2 during the 2008–09 season.

Club career
Lina started playing football at the age of 5 at the Red Star Baie-Mahault club. At the age of 20, he joined Evolucas in the top level of Guadeloupe football. Whilst at the club he was selected by the Guadeloupe team, alongside pro players such as Aurélien Capoue and Stéphane Auvray. It was Auvray's move to Vannes OC which opened up the opportunity for Lina to trial with the club after the 2008 Caribbean Cup.

In July 2009, he was offered an amateur contract with Vannes, to play in their reserve team, but a month later, on 26 August 2009, he made his first team debut in the 2009–10 Coupe de la Ligue second round against AC Ajaccio. He made his Ligue 2 debut four days later against Le Havre AC. Injuries prevented him making appearances in the 2010–11 season, and he was released by Vannes in July 2011.

In September 2011 he was part of the UNFP team of uncontracted players which faced AJ Auxerre.

In February 2012, having not found a club, he was recruited by the manager of the Vannes reserve team.

In August 2012 he signed a contract with Caen, again with the reserve team, with the hope of gaining access to the first team. In January 2013, he was allowed to sign for AS Cherbourg in Championnat National. At the end of the season, Cherbourg were relegated, and Lina was recruited by ES Uzès Pont du Gard, who had just been re-drafted to the division.

Lina played three seasons for Béziers between 2014 and 2017, during which time he was made captain, before signing for US Boulogne in June 2017. On 1 February 2021, his contract with Boulogne was terminated by mutual agreement.

References

External links
 
 

1986 births
Living people
Association football defenders
Guadeloupean footballers
Guadeloupe international footballers
Ligue 2 players
Championnat National players
Championnat National 2 players
Championnat National 3 players
Vannes OC players
AS Cherbourg Football players
ES Uzès Pont du Gard players
AS Béziers (2007) players
US Boulogne players
2009 CONCACAF Gold Cup players